Catasetum maculatum, the spotted catasetum, is a species of orchid found from Central America to Venezuela. The flowers are dimorphic, and the male and female flowers look so different that they were originally thought to be two separate species.  A few days after opening, the male flowers emit a strong odor, which serves to attract bees.

References

Orchids of Central America
maculatum
Orchids of Venezuela